France Telecom SA v Commission (2009) C-202/07 is a European competition law case relevant for UK enterprise law, concerning telecommunications.

Facts
Wanadoo Interactive was part of France Telecom SA after a merger. The Commission found it to have set predatory prices ‘as part of a plan to pre-empt the market in high-speed internet access during a key phase in its development’. France Telecom argued that such a charge should only succeed if proven that the predator is capable of recouping the losses it incurs during its campaign.

The Advocate General's Opinion was sympathetic to recoupment argument.

Judgment
The CJEU held that there is no requirement to prove that recouping losses is possible, and so there was abuse of a dominant position.

See also

United Kingdom enterprise law
EU law

Notes

References

United Kingdom enterprise case law